Heroes of Might and Magic is a series of games that were remade for the Game Boy Color. They are based on early games in the original Heroes of Might and Magic series. The remakes were developed by KnowWonder and published by The 3DO Company.

Heroes of Might and Magic

The first game is a port of Heroes of Might and Magic: A Strategic Quest, but without multiplayer capabilities.

Heroes of Might and Magic II

The second game is a mix of the first three Heroes with many graphics converted from Heroes of Might and Magic III, while gameplay functionality resembles a mix of Heroes I, II and III. The campaign centers around a dragon slayer quest.

Towns and creatures
There are four towns available to play: Knight, Barbarian, Sorceress and Warlock town. Each town has seven different troops available, most of them being directly copied from Heroes of Might and Magic III, having the same stats, abilities and appearance. The knight town uses troops from the Heroes of Might and Magic III Castle faction, the Barbarian has Stronghold troops, the Sorceress has Rampart troops and the Warlock has Fortress troops. There are also a few neutral troops available, not belonging to any town.

Reception

Heroes of Might and Magic

The original Heroes received mixed reviews according to the review aggregation website GameRankings.

Heroes of Might and Magic II

Heroes II received more favorable reviews than the original according to GameRankings.

References

External links
 
 

2000 video games
Game Boy Color games
Game Boy Color-only games
Heroes of Might and Magic
The 3DO Company games
Video game remakes
Video games developed in the United States
Amaze Entertainment games